Andrea Rolla (born 4 December 1983, Piano di Sorrento, Naples, Italy) is an Italian swimmer. He competed for Italy at the 2012 Summer Olympics in the men's 4 x 100 m freestyle relay.

References

Italian male swimmers
Swimmers at the 2012 Summer Olympics
Olympic swimmers of Italy
1989 births
Living people
European Aquatics Championships medalists in swimming
Universiade medalists in swimming
Swimmers from Naples
Mediterranean Games bronze medalists for Italy
Mediterranean Games medalists in swimming
Swimmers at the 2009 Mediterranean Games
Universiade gold medalists for Italy
Medalists at the 2009 Summer Universiade
21st-century Italian people